Kevin Miller (born 12 October 1936) is an Australian former cricketer. He played one first-class match for Tasmania in 1960/61.

See also
 List of Tasmanian representative cricketers

References

External links
 

1936 births
Living people
Australian cricketers
Tasmania cricketers
Cricketers from Launceston, Tasmania